Canteen Lunch in the Alley is a restaurant located in Ottumwa, Iowa. The original five-stool Canteen Lunch was opened in 1927 in a different location, and moved to its current address in 1936. It has since been a local institution known for their loose-meat sandwiches (originally called "scrambled hamburgers" in Iowa) and homemade pies. The restaurant's design is a horseshoe-shaped counter-top surrounded by 16 stools.
The “Canteen Lunch” was originally established in 1927. In 1936, the business relocated to its present location under the second street parking ramp in Ottumwa, Iowa. It remains an outstanding example of an early to mid-20th century lunchroom. The “Canteen Lunch” reflects on this type of eating establishment that gained popularity in the 1920s and 1930s as social and economic challenges were felt by the Great Depression.

Lunchrooms like “The Canteen” were frequented by those who had a small budget for eating out, but still needed to have lunch. Places like “The Canteen” offered simple short-order food in an informal place to meet and socialize. They were typically frequented by male workers and were typically located near factories.

The Canteen Lunch remains in operation today. The canteen sandwich (or locally, “Canteen”) is a loose-meat sandwich resembling that of a “Maid-Rite” or “Sloppy Joe”; however, it is seasoned differently and served more similarly to a hamburger with condiments like pickles, ketchup and mustard. A cheese sauce can be added for a small additional charge.

The lunchroom itself is accessed through an alley and is sought out by native Ottumwans as a first order of business when returning home. The friendly atmosphere coupled with simple but tasty food draws natives and visitors alike.

The sandwich and operations are intriguing in design. Every day, the lunchroom prepares 100-150 lbs of ground beef. The grind is finer than standard store ground beef. Attempts to use a coarser grind were immediately noticed by the patrons and rejected in favor of the finer grind. The sandwich is served on an oversized custom-made hamburger bun that is cut and left hinged just prior to making the sandwich. The sandwich is placed in a custom wax paper wrapper that has a thicker than average wax coating for extra protection. A teaspoon is traditionally included with the sandwich to scoop out any remaining beef from the paper after finishing the sandwich.

The layout of the restaurant is just as essential to the lunchroom's success. The horseshoe-shaped counter wraps around the freestanding metal steamer. One waitress continually stirs the beef as it cooks in full sight of the patrons. Another waitress cuts the buns and adds the condiments, and another ladles the loose meat onto the buns and wraps them in their signature wax paper. This show is an integral part of the dining experience for the canteen's new and seasoned customers.

The price of a "Canteen" is just as modest today as it was during the Depression. A full meal with a piece of pie can still be obtained for less than $5.

In 2000, the City of Ottumwa pursued the construction of a downtown parking ramp in the current location of the canteen. Upon offering to purchase the building, or paying for the building to be moved to another location, the owners and patrons alike insisted that it remain in place. Subsequently, in 2004 air rights were purchased above the canteen and a parking ramp was constructed overhead.

The Canteen was the model for the Lanford Lunch Box restaurant opened by Roseanne Conner (played by Roseanne Barr) in the sitcom Roseanne. Barr was married to actor Tom Arnold, a native of Ottumwa, and they frequently visited Ottumwa during their marriage.

On November 20, 2015, Scott and Janice Pierce became the new owners of the Canteen Lunch in the Alley in Ottumwa, Iowa.

See also
 Maid-Rite
 Maid-Rite Sandwich Shop (Springfield, Illinois)
 Tavern sandwich

References

External links
 canteenottumwa.com

1927 establishments in Iowa
1936 establishments in Iowa
Iowa culture
Buildings and structures in Ottumwa, Iowa
Restaurants established in 1927
Restaurants established in 1936
Restaurants in Iowa
Tourist attractions in Wapello County, Iowa